Oktyabrskoye is a rural locality (a selo) and the administrative centre of Oktyabrsky Selsoviet, Khasavyurtovsky District, Republic of Dagestan, Russia. The population was 2,246 as of 2010. There are 34 streets.

Geography 
Oktyabrskoye is located 35 km north of Khasavyurt (the district's administrative centre) by road. Dzerzhinskoye is the nearest rural locality.

References 

Rural localities in Khasavyurtovsky District